Bhupatiraju Ravi Shankar Raju (born 26 January 1968), known professionally as Ravi Teja, is an Indian film actor and producer who mainly works in Telugu cinema. Known for his roles in action comedy films, he is popular by the moniker "Mass Maharaja". One of the highest-paid Telugu film actors, Teja has won three state Nandi Awards and one Filmfare Award South. He was featured by Forbes India in the list of top 100 Celebrities in 2012, 2013, and 2015.

Teja started his film career with an uncredited role in Karthavyam (1990) and then played similar minor parts in films such as Allari Priyudu (1993), Ninne Pelladata (1996). Then he essayed meatier supporting roles in Sindhooram (1997), Manasichi Choodu (1998), Premaku Velayara (1999), Samudram (1999), Annayya (2000) among others and also worked as an assistant director for several films.

Teja's first lead role came with Nee Kosam (1999), which was an average grosser at the box office but won him the Nandi Special Jury Award. He established himself as a leading actor with Itlu Sravani Subramanyam (2001), Avunu Valliddaru Ista Paddaru! (2002), and Idiot (2002). Teja then went on to star in notable films like Khadgam (2002), Amma Nanna O Tamila Ammayi (2003), Venky (2004), Naa Autograph (2004), Bhadra (2005), Vikramarkudu (2006), Dubai Seenu (2007), Krishna (2008), Neninthe (2008), Kick (2009), Sambho Siva Sambho (2010), Don Seenu (2010), Mirapakay (2011), Balupu (2013), Power (2014), Bengal Tiger (2015), Raja the Great (2017), Krack (2021), Dhamaka (2022) and  Waltair Veerayya (2023). Ravi Teja is widely known for his comic timing.

Early life
Ravi Teja was born in Jaggampeta in the erstwhile East Godavari district of Andhra Pradesh. His father, Bhoopatiraju Rajagopal Raju was a pharmacist and his mother, Bhoopatiraju Rajya Lakshmi was a homemaker. Ravi Teja is the eldest of three sons, the others being Bharath and Raghu, who are also actors.

He spent most of his childhood in Northern India because of his father's work. His schooling was done in Jaipur, Delhi, Mumbai, and Bhopal. He was fascinated with cinema right from his childhood. He idolized Amitabh Bachchan and would re-enact scenes from his films at home. Later on he moved to Vijayawada along with his family. He completed his Bachelor's degree in Arts at Siddhartha Degree College, Vijayawada. He is fluent in both Telugu and Hindi.

On May 26, 2002 Ravi Teja married Kalyani who hails from Ganapavaram, West Godavari District. The couple has a daughter, Mokshadha and a son, Mahadhan.

Film career

1988–1996: Early struggles
Half way through his graduation, he went to Madras in 1988 to pursue a career in films. In his early years in Madras, YVS Chowdary and Gunasekhar were his roommates. He played small roles in the films Karthavyam (1990), Abhimanyu (1990), Chaitanya (1991), Collector Gaari Alludu (1992), and Aaj Ka Goonda Raj (1992). Ravi Teja became an assistant director, working in both television and film. As an assistant director, he worked in several Bollywood as well as Telugu projects including Prathihnbandh, Aaj Ka Goonda Raj, and Criminal. He met Krishna Vamsi and worked as an assistant director under him for the 1996 hit film Ninne Pelladata. Vamsi also gave Ravi Teja the opportunity to act in a small role in that film. He continued to work as an assistant director for a few other films.

1997–2000: Recognition
In 1997, while still working as an assistant director, Ravi Teja got an opportunity to act in the film Sindhooram directed by Krishna Vamsi in a supporting role. The film won the National Film Award for Best Feature Film in Telugu.

Ravi Teja followed up with roles in the films Seetha Rama Raju, Padutha Teeyaga, Manasichhi Choodu and Krishna Reddy's Premaku Velayara. In 1999, he was cast in a leading role by Srinu Vaitla for Nee Kosam. The film won the Silver Nandi for Best Film. Ravi Teja won the Nandi Award for Best Actor Special Jury for his performance.  Following this, he started appearing in more significant roles such as Krishna Vamsi's Samudram, Chiranjeevi's Annayya and Budget Padmanabham. He also appeared in lead roles in multi-starrer films such as Kshemanga Velli Labanga Randi, Tirumala Tirupathi Venkatesa, Sakuntumba Sapari Vare Sametham and Ammayi Kosam.

2001–2005: Breakthrough as a lead actor
In 2001, Ravi Teja's association with Puri Jagannadh began when he cast Ravi Teja as the lead role in Itlu Sravani Subramanyam. The film was a commercial hit and got Ravi Teja credibility as a solo lead actor. In 2002, his next film Avunu Valliddaru Ista Paddaru!, directed by Vamsy and co-starring Kalyani was released. The film was a successful at the box office and won Ravi Teja acclaim. The year also saw Ravi Teja in Idiot. Directed by Puri Jagannadh and co-starring Rakshita, it was a blockbuster hit and Ravi Teja's performance and dialogue delivery were praised by critics and movie-goers alike.

The year also saw the release of Krishna Vamsi's Khadgam. The film was a huge success at the box office and won the Sarojini Devi Award for a Film on National Integration. Ravi Teja's portrayal of a young wannabe actor won him the Nandi Special Jury Award for the second time. In 2003, Ravi Teja again worked with director Puri Jagannadh for Amma Nanna O Tamila Ammayi. The film co-starring Asin became a blockbuster hit and Jeevi of Idlebrain praised him: "Ravi Teja did well. His strength lies in his dialogue delivery and reckless body language". The year also saw Ravi Teja working in commercially successful films such as Dongodu, co-starring Kalyani and directed by Srinivas Bheemineni and Veede, co-starring Aarthi Agarwal and directed by Ravi Raja Pinisetty. In the same year, Ravi Teja was also seen in films such as Ee Abbayee Chala Manchodu, Anveshana and Oka Raju Oka Rani, which failed to do well at the box office.

In 2004, Ravi Teja starred in Venky, directed by Vaitla. Idlebrain wrote: "His comedy is very good in the first half. His antics with Siddanthi and the way he curses himself in front of the mirror is hilarious". He appeared in Naa Autograph directed by cinematographer turned director S. Gopal Reddy. A critic from nowrunning.com wrote: "Ravi Teja delivers a stunning performance as a dejected lover". Chanti was directed by Sobhan. In 2005, Ravi Teja's work included Bhadra, directed by Boyapati Srinu and Bhageeratha, directed by Rasool Ellore. He also worked in the crime film Shock, directed by Harish Shankar and produced by Ram Gopal Varma.

2006–2011: Commercial success
In 2006, Ravi Teja worked with director S. S. Rajamouli for Vikramarkudu. The film which grossed over  proved to be his highest-grossing film until then. Idlebrain praised his performance: "Vikramarkudu is the best film of Ravi Teja so far in histrionics aspect. He did both characters of Athali Sathi Babu and Vikram Rathod equally well, His mannerism of "jintata" is simply superb". Consequently, Ravi Teja went on to play the lead in Khatarnak (2006) and Dubai Seenu (2007), his third collaboration with director Vaitla. In 2008, Ravi Teja acted in three films, V. V. Vinayak's Krishna, Baladur and Neninthe. Neninthe marked his fourth collaboration with director Puri. Although the film was not successful at the box office, Ravi Teja's portrayal of an up-and-coming director in the film received acclaim and won him Nandi Award for Best Actor.

In 2009, Ravi Teja worked with director Surender Reddy for action comedy Kick. Later that year, he appeared in Anjaneyulu. In 2010, his films included Shambo Shiva Shambo and Gopichand Malineni-directed Don Seenu.

In 2011, Ravi Teja appeared in four films. His first release was Harish Shankar's Mirapakay. He later starred in Ram Gopal Varma's Dongala Mutha and made a cameo appearance as a body double of himself in Katha Screenplay Darshakatvam Appalaraju, also directed Varma. His last release of the year was Veera. Later after this film, he went on to be called "Mass Maharaja" for his mass action scenes.

2012–present: Career slump and resurgence
In 2012, Ravi Teja starred in four films starring with Gunasekhar's Nippu and Siva's Daruvu. He collaborated for the fifth time with director Puri for the fantasy comedy Devudu Chesina Manushulu. He later appeared in Parasuram's Sarocharu  Rediff.com wrote: "Ravi Teja is in a different avatar, a more subdued one. A change of image and role is necessary for an actor and Ravi Teja makes the transition fairly well".

In 2013, Ravi Teja started in Malineni's action comedy Balupu. The Times of India wrote, "Ravi Teja has come up with an entertaining performance. His characterization and the flashback episode as Kancharapalem Shankar looked very powerful on the screen. He gets into the skin of the character and has done well." The film turned one of the biggest commercial successes of the year.

In 2014, he starred in Power with debutant director K. S. Ravindra along with a cameo appearance in Sairam Shankar's Romeo. In 2015, he collaborated with director Surender Reddy again for Kick's sequel. Kick 2,  produced by Nandamuri Kalyan Ram. Despite huge expectations, the film was a box office failure. He later played the lead in Bengal Tiger (2015), directed by Sampath Nandi.

After taking a sabbatical for one year, he played a blind man in Anil Ravipudi-directed Raja the Great (2017). The film was Ravi Teja's first  grosser and one of his biggest hits. In 2018, Ravi Teja starred in three films, Touch Chesi Chudu, Nela Ticket, and Amar Akbar Anthony, which were all huge critical and commercial failures. His only film in 2020, Disco Raja, where he played a dual role, also bombed at the box office.

In 2021, Krack marked his third collaboration with Gopichand Malineni, after Don Seenu and Balupu. It was highly successful at the box office and a big comeback for him. 

In 2022, his first two films, Khiladi and Ramarao on Duty, both ended up as huge box office disasters. However, his third release in the year, Dhamaka, was highly successful at the box office, eventually becoming the highest-grossing film of his career.

In 2023, he reunited with Chiranjeevi, after Annayya, for Waltair Veerayya. It was also his second collaboration with K. S. Ravindra, after Power.

Filmography

Awards and nominations

See also
 List of Indian film actors

References

External links

 
 
 

Living people
Telugu male actors
Male actors from Andhra Pradesh
Male actors in Telugu cinema
Male actors in Hindi cinema
20th-century Indian male actors
21st-century Indian male actors
Indian male film actors
Nandi Award winners
People from East Godavari district
1968 births
People from Andhra Pradesh
Indian actors
Indian film actors
Indian film award winners